Borvizu River may refer to:

Borviz, a tributary of the Capra in Neamț County, Romania
Borviz, a tributary of the Cașin in Harghita County, Romania